Salvador Seguí Rubinat (23 September 1887, in Lleida – 10 March 1923, in Barcelona), known as El noi del sucre ("the sugar boy" in Catalan) for his habit of eating the sugar cubes served him with his coffee, was a Catalan anarcho-syndicalist in the Confederación Nacional del Trabajo (CNT), a Spanish confederation of anarcho-syndicalist labor unions active in Catalonia.

Biography 
Together with Ángel Pestaña, Seguí opposed the paramilitary actions advocated and carried out by other members of the CNT. On 10 March 1923, while completing preparations to promote the idea of emancipation as a form of social empowerment among workers, he was assassinated by gunshot on Carrer de la Cadena, in Barcelona's Raval District, at the hands of gunmen working for the Catalan employers' organisation under protection of Catalonia's Civil Governor, Martínez Anido. At this same shooting, another anarcho-syndicalist, Francesc Comes, known as Perones, was wounded and was to die several days later.

He has received many tributes since his death, and a foundation has been launched in his memory, the Fundación Salvador Seguí, based in Barcelona, Madrid and Valencia. He was buried in the Cemetery of Montjuïc, Barcelona

Bibliography 
 Seguí, Salvador «Noy del Sucre». Escuela de Rebeldía (Historia de un sindicalista), Ilustraciones de M. Ramos, Madrid, La Novela de Hoy (Sucesores de Rivadeneyra), 1923.
 Seguí, Salvador. Narraciones. anarco-sindicalistas de los años veinte / Salvador Seguí...[et al.], Barcelona, Icaria, 1978.

See also 
 La Canadenca strike

References

External links

 Fundación Salvador Seguí (in Spanish)
 Groupe anarchiste Salvador-Segui (in French)

1887 births
1923 deaths
People from Lleida
Anarchists from Catalonia
Confederación Nacional del Trabajo members
Anarcho-syndicalists
Inmates of Presó Model de Barcelona

Murdered anarchists